Adajya is a 1996 Indian Assamese language drama film directed by Santwana Bardoloi based on the novel Dontal Haatir Uiye Khowa Haoda by Indira Goswami. The film was screened at several international film festivals.

Plot
The film is set in 1940s Assam. Three widows struggle to lead dignified lives despite the extreme restrictions mandated by law and custom. The arrival of a young American scholar, a poisonous snakebite, and the theft of ancestral jewelry combine to bring the situation of the young and beautiful widow Giribala to a painful crisis.

Cast
Tom Alter as Mark Sahib
Trisha Saikia as Giribala
Bishnu Kharghoria
Triveni Bora
Bhagirothi
Nilu Chakrabarty
Chetana Das
Indira Das
Mintu Barua

Awards
44th National Film Awards
Best Feature Film in Assamese
Best Cinematography – Mrinalkanti Das (also for Rag Birag)
National Film Award – Special Mention – Bhagirothi (also for Dolon Roy for Sanghat)
International Film Festival of India
Special Jury Award

References

External links
 
Adajaya preview

1996 films
1996 romantic drama films
Indian romantic drama films
Films whose cinematographer won the Best Cinematography National Film Award
Films set in Assam
Films based on Indian novels
Best Assamese Feature Film National Film Award winners
1990s Assamese-language films